Vindicator is the first solo album by Arthur Lee, formerly of the rock band Love, released in 1972. The backing musicians are credited as Band-Aid.

A cover of the track "Everybody's Gotta Live" was recorded by American rapper and singer Mac Miller, and released on his posthumous album Circles in 2020.

Track listing
All tracks composed by Arthur Lee; except where indicated
"Sad Song" – 2:20
"You Can Save Up to 50%, But You're Still a Long Ways from Home" – 0:17
"Love Jumped Through My Window" – 2:56
"Find Somebody" – 3:47
"He Said She Said" – 2:18
"Every Time I Look Up I'm Down or White Dog (I Don't Know What That Means!)" – 3:57
"Everybody's Gotta Live" – 3:31
"You Want Change for Your Re-Run" – 4:17
"He Knows a Lot of Good Women (Or Scotty's Song)" – 3:14
"Hamburger Breath Stinkfinger" – 2:44
"Ol' Morgue Mouth" – 0:53
"Busted Feet" (Arthur Lee, Charles Karp) – 4:53
Bonus tracks
"Everybody's Gotta Live" – 3:37
"He Knows a Lot of Good Women" – 3:16
"Pencil in Hand" – 2:15
"E-Z Rider" (Jimi Hendrix) – 2:58
"Looking Glass Looking at Me" – 4:05

Personnel
Arthur Lee - rhythm guitar, vocals
Charlie Karp - lead guitar
Frank Fayad - bass on 4,10,11
Clarence McDonald - organ on "Find Somebody"
Don Poncher - drums
Craig Tarwater - lead guitar on 4,10,11
David Hull - bass
Technical
Tommy Vicari - engineer
Steve Mitchell - assistant engineer
Roland Young - art direction
Elijah Alfred - cover photography

References 

1972 debut albums
Albums produced by Arthur Lee (musician)
A&M Records albums